Borders is a 2017 drama film co-produced between Burkina Faso and France, directed and written by Apolline Traoré and starring Amelie Mbaye, Naky Sy Savané, Adizelou Sidi, and Unwana Udobeong in the lead roles.

Plot 
The film tells the stories of four women from different regions who meet on a bus that travels through West Africa and discover that, despite not having any relationship, their lives are pretty similar, as they have had to fight and try to get ahead on their own.

Generalities 
According to its director Apolline Traoré, the entire production team had to make the bus trip that is recounted in the film: "It was necessary to shoot the film along the actual route ... We had to obtain authorizations everywhere and plan the border crossing with the administrations of each country." She also stated that she must have had military assistance to carry out the filming: "Some areas were victims of terrorist attacks, and that is why the army accompanied us. The soldiers knew how to be discreet during the filming; we forgot about them, then we saw them reappear to escort us every time our convoy left.

Cast 

 Amelie Mbaye - Hadjara
 Kany Sy Savané - Emma
 Unwana Udobang - Micha
 Adizetou Sidi - Sali

Reception

Reviews 
Borders was on the list of the twenty best African films of all time, published by the British newspaper The Guardian. On the France24 portal, it is recognized as “an opportunity to show several united faces of Africa in a harmonious and chaotic mix at the same time. Apolline Traoré does not stop reproducing the diversity of cultures on the screen. These encounters are not accidental, they are real in everyday life". The director's work was praised in the French magazine Jeune Afrique: "The upward work close to the report and the shooting conditions naturally had an impact on the authenticity of the film, which is sometimes close to the documentary format. As in previous productions of hers, Traoré points her lens at women battered by fate, but who have decided to fight."

Awards and recognition 
The film earned its director the Audience Award at the World Cinema Amsterdam event, held in the Netherlands in 2017. At the Pan-African Film and Television Festival in Ouagadougou the same year, it won the ECOWAS awards, Félix Houphouët-Boigny and Paul Robeson.

References

External links 

 Borders at FilmAffinity (in Spanish)

2010s French-language films
2017 drama films
2017 films
Burkinabé drama films
French drama films
2010s French films